Carlos Pellegrini is a station on Line B of the Buenos Aires Underground.  From here, passengers may transfer to the Diagonal Norte Station on Line C and the 9 de Julio Station on Line D and Metrobus 9 de Julio. The station was opened on 22 July 1931 as the eastern terminus of the extension of the line from Callao. In December 1931, the line was extended further east to Leandro N. Alem.

Overview
The station is located at the intersection of Avenida Corrientes and Calle Carlos Pellegrini, and named after the latter. The station is directly underneath the Plaza de la República, home to the famous Obelisco de Buenos Aires.

Gallery

References

External links

Buenos Aires Underground stations
Railway stations opened in 1931
1931 establishments in Argentina